Aardman Animations is an animation studio in Bristol, England that produces stop motion and computer-animated features, shorts, TV series and adverts.

Filmography

Feature films

Released films

Note: Rights to the Aardman films produced with DreamWorks Animation are now owned by Universal Pictures, following NBCUniversal's purchase of DreamWorks in 2016.

Upcoming films

TV Shows

Short films

 Vision On (1972–76)
 Aard-Man (1972–73)
 Greeblies (1974–75)
 Take Hart (1977–82)
 Animated Conversations: Down and Out (1977)
 Animated Conversations: Confessions of a Foyer Girl (1978)
 Conversation Pieces: On Probation (1983)
 Conversation Pieces: Sales Pitch (1983)
 Conversation Pieces: Palmy Days (1983)
 Conversation Pieces: Early Bird (1983)
 Conversation Pieces: Late Edition (1983)
 Hartbeat (1984–93)
 Sweet Disaster: Babylon (1986)
 Wallace & Gromit: A Grand Day Out (1989)
 Creature Comforts (1989)
 War Story (1989)
 Going Equipped (1990)
 Ident (1990)
 Next (1990)
 Rex the Runt: How Dinosaurs Became Extinct (1991)
 Rex the Runt: Dreams (1991)
 Adam (1992)
 Never Say Pink Furry Die (1992)
 Loves Me, Loves Me Not (1993)
 Not Without My Handbag (1993)
 Wallace & Gromit: The Wrong Trousers (1993)
 Pib and Pog (1995)
 Wallace & Gromit: A Close Shave (1995)
 The Art Box Bunch (1995)
 Rex the Runt: North by North Pole (1996)
 Pop (1996)
 Wat's Pig (1996)
 Owzat (1997)
 Stage Fright (1997)
 Al Dente (1998)
 Smart Hart (1999-2000)
 Humdrum (1999)
 Minotaur and Little Nerkin (1999)
 The Deadline (2001)
 Len's Lens (2002)
 The Non-Voters (for the BBC Election coverage) (2004)
 The Adventures of Jeffrey (2005)
 Angry Kid: Who do you think you are? (2004)
 The Pearce Sisters (2007)
 Wallace & Gromit: A Matter of Loaf and Death (2008)
 Gulp (2011)
 The Itch of The Golden Nit (2011)
 Pythagasaurus (2011)
 Fly (2011)
 DC's World Funnest ("DC Nation Shorts") (2012–2014)
 Timmy Time – Timmy's Christmas Surprise (2011)
 Timmy Time – Timmy's Seaside Rescue (2012)
 Wallace & Gromit's Jubilee Bunt-a-thon (2012)
 The Pirates! So You Want to Be a Pirate! (2012)
 Wallace & Gromit's Musical Marvels (2012)
 Darkside (2013)
 Sphere (2013)
 Zombie Fairy (2014) 
 Ray's Big Idea (2014)
 Special Delivery (2015)
 Full ANL (2015)
 Shaun the Sheep: The Farmer's Llamas (2015)
 Aardman Nathan Love (2015)
 Mac (2016)
 NSPCC (2016)
 Visualise This (2017)
 Robin Robin (2021)
 Shaun the Sheep: The Flight Before Christmas (2021)
 Star Wars: Visions: I Am Your Mother (2023)

Music videos

 "Sledgehammer" (1986)
 "My Baby Just Cares for Me" (1987)
 "Barefootin" (1987)
 "In Your Wildest Dreams" (1996)
 "Viva Forever" (1998)
 "Gridlock" (1999)
 "Life's A Treat" (2007)
 "Santa Claus Is Coming to Town (Justin Bieber Cover)" (2011)
 "Life's A Treat (Rizzle Kicks Remix)" (2015)
 "Feels Like Summer" (2015)
 "OFFF Barcelona 2016 Main Titles" (2017)  
 "Daddy" (2019)

Commercials
This is a selected list of commercials produced by Aardman. By 2000, the studio had produced over 100 commercials, at a rate of 15–20 spots per year. In the year 2009 alone, the studio produced 106 commercials.

 Lurpak (1986)
 Hamlet (1987)
 Jordans (1987)
 Domestos (1987)
 Creature comforts for the Electricity Board's "Heat Electric" campaign(1990)
 Enterprise 64
 Cadbury Creme Egg
 Cadbury's Crunchie
 Kellogg's Rice Krispies
 Lyle's Golden Syrup
 Weetos
 Smarties "Smartiepants" (1995)
 Walkers Potato Crisps and Snacks
 Quavers (1996)
 Britannia Building Society (1997)
 Glico Pucchin Pudding (Japan, 1998, 2000)
 Chevron Cars
 Dairylea
 Lipton
 Serta Counting Sheep
 Pringles
 Burger King
 Polo Mints
 British Telecom
 Tennent's Lager
 Lego
 Jacob's Cream Crackers
 Kellogg's Fruit Twistables
 Hubba Bubba
 PG Tips "Moving-in Interview", "Cupboard" (2002–2005)
 Weetabix
 Npower (2009, 2011)
 National Accident Helpline featuring Underdog (2009)
 Change4Life
 Hotels.com (2009)
 Nokia "Dot" (2010)
 VisitEngland (2013, 2015)
 McDonald's Happy Meal (2013)
 Bloo
 Electrolux
 Bristol Ageing Better (2015)
 United Nations "We Have a Plan" (2015)
 What if...Santa Forgot"
 Sinutab/Sudafed (2014, 2016)
 Prevacid (2000) 
 Zantac (2013)
 DFS Furniture (2019)
short film "Turtle Journey" as a commercial  for Greenpeace.(2020)

Idents
 BBC Two Christmas idents (1995)
 BBC One Christmas idents (2001, 2008, 2021)
 BBC Three idents (2003)
 CBBC idents (2007)
 Watch idents (2009)
 BBC Two 'Curve' idents (2018)
 Nickelodeon idents (2021)

Apps
 Wizards vs Aliens: The Eye of Bashtarr (2013)
 Escargot Escape Artistes (2015)

Crew

Upcoming films

Video games

Accolades

Academy Awards

Golden Globe Awards

BAFTA Awards

Annie Awards

Critic's Choice Awards

Kids' Choice Awards

Unproduced projects

See also
 List of DreamWorks Animation productions
 Shrek (franchise)
 How to Train Your Dragon (franchise)
 List of Sony Pictures Animation productions
 List of StudioCanal theatrical animated features
 List of Paramount Pictures theatrical animated feature films
 List of Universal Pictures theatrical animated feature films
 List of Warner Bros. theatrical animated feature films
 List of Disney theatrical animated feature films
 List of 20th Century Studios theatrical animated feature films
 List of New Line Cinema theatrical animated feature films
 List of Miramax theatrical animated feature films
 List of Pixar films
 List of Illumination productions
 List of Nickelodeon original films

References

External links
 
 Aardman Animations at Newgrounds

Filmographies